Barnston is a surname, and may refer to:

 Harry Barnston (1870–1929), British Conservative politician
 Henry Barnston (1868–1949), English-American rabbi
 George Barnston (c.1800–1883), Scottish fur trader and naturalist
 James Barnston (1831–1858), Canadian physician
 John Barnston (died 1645), English divine
 John George Barnston (c.1838–1883), lawyer and political figure in British Columbia